Joshua Field may refer to:

Joshua Field (engineer) (1786–1863), British mechanical engineer
Joshua Field (artist) (born 1973), American artist

See also
Josh Fields (disambiguation)